A. K. N. Ahmed ( – 24 February 2016) was a Bangladeshi economist and diplomat. He served as the second Governor of Bangladesh Bank, the central bank of Bangladesh from November 1974 until July 1976.

Career
Ahmed worked for World Bank, International Monetary Fund, and served as a Bangladesh ambassador to Japan and South Korea. Ahmed had been the second governor of the central bank from 19 November 1974 until 13 July 1976 when he resigned from the position.

Ahmed died at the age of 91 on 24 February 2016 after a stroke in the United States.

Bangladesh Institute of Bank Managemnt, BIBM, had hosted an annual lecture on banking in the memory of AKN Ahmed. .

References

1930s births
2016 deaths
20th-century Bangladeshi economists
Governors of Bangladesh Bank
Ambassadors of Bangladesh to Japan
Ambassadors of Bangladesh to South Korea
Place of birth missing
Year of birth missing
Bangladesh Krishak Sramik Awami League central committee members